Handren Sport Club is an Iraqi football team based in Erbil, that plays in Iraq Division Two and Kurdistan Premier League.

Managerial history
  Delshad Maarouf

Honours

Domestic
Kurdistan Premier League
Winners (1): 2010–11

References

External links
 Iraq Clubs- Foundation Dates

2003 establishments in Iraq
Association football clubs established in 2003
Football clubs in Erbil